Giannis Christofilopoulos (born 17 July 2003) is a Greek professional footballer who plays as a centre-back for Super League 2 club AEK Athens B.

References

2003 births
Living people
Greek footballers
Greece youth international footballers
Super League Greece 2 players
Olympiacos F.C. players
Association football defenders
Olympiacos F.C. B players
Panionios F.C. players